Accumulated cyclone energy (ACE) is a metric used by various agencies to express the energy released by a tropical cyclone during its lifetime. It is calculating by summing the square of a tropical cyclone's maximum sustained winds, measured every six hours. The resulting total can be divided by 10,000 to make it more manageable, or added to other totals in order to work out a total for a particular group of storms.

The calculation was originally created by William Gray and his associates at Colorado State University as the Hurricane Destruction Potential index, which took the square of each hurricane's maximum sustained winds above  every six hours. This index was adjusted by the United States National Oceanic and Atmospheric Administration in 2000 to include all tropical cyclones, with winds above  and renamed accumulated cyclone energy. The index has since been used by various other agencies to calculate a storm's accumulated cyclone energy, including the Australian Bureau of Meteorology as well as the India Meteorological Department.

The highest ACE calculated for a single tropical cyclone on record worldwide is 87.01, set by Cyclone Freddy in 2023.

History
The accumulated cyclone energy index was originally created by William Gray and his associates at Colorado State University, as the Hurricane Destruction Potential index (HDP). They argued that the destruction of a hurricane's wind and storm surge was better related to the square of the maximum wind speed (Vmax2) than simply to the maximum wind speed. The index was calculated by squaring the estimated maximum sustained wind speed by themselves, for all tropical cyclones with windspeeds of above  every six hours over the entire season. This scale was subsequently adjusted by the United States National Oceanic and Atmospheric Administration (NOAA) to include all tropical cyclones, with winds above . NOAA also renamed it the accumulated cyclone energy index. Since the scale was adjusted by NOAA, the storm totals have been used in a number of different ways, by various agencies and researchers, including the Australian Bureau of Meteorology and the India Meteorological Department. These purposes include to categorize how active a tropical cyclone season was as well as to identify possible long-term trends in a certain area such as the Lesser Antilles.

Calculation
The numbers are usually divided by 10,000 to make them more manageable. One unit of ACE equals  and for use as an index the unit is assumed. Thus:

 

where vmax is estimated sustained wind speed in knots.

Kinetic energy is proportional to the square of velocity, and by adding together the energy per some interval of time, the accumulated energy is found. As the duration of a storm increases, more values are summed and the ACE also increases such that longer-duration storms may accumulate a larger ACE than more-powerful storms of lesser duration. Although ACE is a value roughly proportional to the definite integral over time of the kinetic energy of the system, it is not a direct calculation of energy (the mass of the moved air and therefore the size of the storm would affect a real energy calculation).

Atlantic Ocean

Within the Atlantic Ocean, the United States National Oceanic and Atmospheric Administration and others use the ACE index of a season to classify the season into one of four categories. These four categories are extremely active, above-normal, near-normal, and below-normal, and are worked out using an approximate quartile partitioning of seasons based on the ACE index over the 70 years between 1951 and 2020. The median value of the ACE index from 1951 to 2020 is 96.7 x 104 kt2.

Individual storms in the Atlantic
The highest ever ACE estimated for a single storm in the Atlantic is 73.6, for the San Ciriaco hurricane in 1899. A Category 4 hurricane which lasted for four weeks, this single storm had an ACE higher than many whole Atlantic storm seasons. Other Atlantic storms with high ACEs include Hurricane Ivan in 2004, with an ACE of 70.4, Hurricane Irma in 2017, with an ACE of 64.9, the Great Charleston Hurricane in 1893, with an ACE of 63.5, Hurricane Isabel in 2003, with an ACE of 63.3, and the 1932 Cuba hurricane, with an ACE of 59.8.

Since 1950, the highest ACE of a tropical storm was Tropical Storm Laura in 1971, which attained an ACE of 8.6. The highest ACE of a Category 1 hurricane was Hurricane Nadine in 2012, which attained an ACE of 26.3. The lowest ACE of a tropical storm were tropical storms Chris (2000) and Philippe (2017), both of which were tropical storms for only six hours and had an ACE of just 0.1. The lowest ACE of any hurricane was 2005's Hurricane Cindy, which was only a hurricane for six hours, and 2007's Hurricane Lorenzo, which was a hurricane for twelve hours; Cindy had an ACE of just  1.5175 and Lorenzo had a lower ACE of only 1.475. The lowest ACE of a major hurricane (Category 3 or higher), was Hurricane Gerda in 1969, with an ACE of 5.3.
The following table shows those storms in the Atlantic basin from 1851–2021 that have attained over 50 points of ACE.

Historical ACE in recorded Atlantic hurricane history

There is an undercount bias of tropical storms, hurricanes, and major hurricanes before the satellite era (prior to the mid–1960s), due to the difficulty in identifying storms.

Classification criteria

Eastern Pacific

Within the Eastern Pacific Ocean, the United States National Oceanic and Atmospheric Administration and others use the ACE index of a season to classify the season into one of three categories. These three categories are above-, near-, and below-normal and are worked out using an approximate tercile partitioning of seasons based on the ACE index and the number of tropical storms, hurricanes, and major hurricanes over the 30 years between 1991 and 2020.

For a season to be defined as above-normal, the ACE index criterion and two or more of the other criteria given in the table below must be satisfied.

The mean value of the ACE index from 1991 to 2020 is 108.7 x 104 kt2, while the median value is 97.2 x 104 kt2.

Individual storms in the Pacific
The highest ever ACE estimated for a single storm in the Eastern or Central Pacific, while located east of the International Date Line is 62.8, for Hurricane Fico of 1978. Other Eastern Pacific storms with high ACEs include Hurricane John in 1994, with an ACE of 54.0, Hurricane Kevin in 1991, with an ACE of 52.1, and Hurricane Hector of 2018, with an ACE of 50.5.

The following table shows those storms in the Eastern and Central Pacific basins from 1971–2018 that have attained over 30 points of ACE.

 – Indicates that the storm formed in the Eastern/Central Pacific, but crossed 180°W at least once; therefore, only the ACE and number of days spent in the Eastern/Central Pacific are included.

Historical ACE in recorded Pacific hurricane history

Data on ACE is considered reliable starting with the 1971 season.

Classification criteria

North Indian

There are various agencies over the North Indian Ocean that monitor and forecast tropical cyclones, including the United States Joint Typhoon Warning Center, as well as the Bangladesh, Pakistan and India Meteorological Department. As a result, the track and intensity of tropical cyclones differ from each other, and as a result, the accumulated cyclone energy also varies over the region. However, the India Meteorological Department has been designated as the official Regional Specialised Meteorological Centre by the WMO for the region and has worked out the ACE for all cyclonic systems above  based on their best track analysis which goes back to 1982.

See also 

 Atlantic hurricane
 Cyclone Freddy - Produced the highest accumulated cyclone energy amount worldwide.

References

External links
 The International Best Track Archive for Climate Stewardship (IBTrACS)
 Colorado State University's Real Time Tropical Cyclone Statistics
 Ryan Maue's Global Tropical Cyclone Activity

Tropical cyclone meteorology